Lilian Constantini (September 26, 1902 – January 5, 1982) was a French silent actress in the 1920s and 1930s.

Early life
Liliane Louise Hélène Chapiro-Volpert was born on September 26, 1902, in Paris. Her father, Boris Chapiro-Volpert, was a Russian-born chemist. Her mother was Louise Guesde. Her maternal grandfather, Jules Guesde, was a French journalist and Socialist politician.

Career
She was a silent actress, acting in the 1920s and 1930s. She took the stage name of Lilian Constantini.

Personal life
In 1943, she married Charles Schneider, a businessman who served as the Chairman of Schneider Electric from 1942 to 1960. Their daughter, Dominique Schneidre, is a novelist.

Death
She died on January 5, 1982, in Saint-Tropez.

Filmography
La vivante épingle (dir. Jacques Robert, 1921).
La bouquetière des innocents (dir. Jacques Robert, 1923).
Le cousin Pons (dir. Jacques Robert, 1924).
Naples au baiser de feu (dir. Serge Nadejdine, 1925).
La chèvre aux pieds d'or (dir. Jacques Robert, 1926).
En plongée (dir. Jacques Robert, 1926).
Espionnage ou la guerre sans armes (dir. Jean Choux, 1928).
Celles qui s'en font (dir. Germaine Dulac, short film, 1928).
Chacun porte sa croix (dir. Jean Choux, 1929).
Sa maman (dir. Gaston Mouru de Lacotte, 1929).
L'étrange fiancée (dir. Georges Pallu, 1930).
Crime d'amour (dir. Roger Capellani, 1934).
Le coup de trois (dir. Jean de Limur, 1936).

References

External links

1902 births
1982 deaths
Actresses from Paris
French film actresses
French silent film actresses
20th-century French actresses